Compassion is a studio album by jazz trumpeter Wadada Leo Smith and percussionist Adam Rudolph The album was released on May 16, 2006 via Meta and Kabell labels.

Reception

By Chris Kelsey of JazzTimes noted "Ages before reductionist improvisation morphed into a contest to see who could say the least within the longest possible span of time and in the most unmusical way possible, trumpeter/flugelhornist Wadada Leo Smith developed a style built on economy and variable timbre—a style that, while novel, nevertheless embraced essential qualities that distinguish music from random futzing. Compassion is not reductionist. Smith's approach is too direct and organically conceived to be defined so narrowly. But this music does demonstrate how one can explore open space and extremes in tonal color without contrivance."

Track listing

Personnel
Band
Wadada Leo Smith – composer, executive producer, flugelhorn, trumpet
Adam Rudolph – composer, cymbals, dusungoni, executive producer, gong, hand drums, kalimba, percussion, vocals

Production
Jim Hemingway – mastering
Jason Lord – engineer, mixing

References

Wadada Leo Smith albums
2006 albums